ZINC17988990 is a drug which acts as a potent and selective inhibitor for the TRPV5 calcium channel, with an IC50 of 177 nM and high selectivity for TRPV5 over TRPV6 and the other subtypes of TRPV. It is the first selective inhibitor to be developed for TRPV5, and may be useful for modulating calcium reabsorption in the kidneys.

See also
 HC-067047
 SET2

References 

Experimental drugs